Claude Hunt may refer to:

 Claude J. Hunt (1886–1962), American football player and coach
 Claude Hunt (Australian footballer) (1887–1959), Australian rules footballer